Water is a novel by author Bapsi Sidhwa that was published in 2006.

Plot summary
Water is set in 1938, when India was still under the colonial rule of the British, and when the marriage of children to older men was commonplace. Following Hindu tradition, when a man died, his widow would be forced to spend the rest of her life in a widow's ashram, an institution for widows to make amends for the sins from her previous life that supposedly caused her husband's death.

Chuyia (Sarala) is an eight-year-old girl who has just lost her husband. She is deposited in the ashram for Hindu widows to spend the rest of her life in renunciation. She befriends Kalyani who is forced into prostitution to support the ashram, Shakuntala, one of the widows, and Narayan, a young and charming upper-class follower of Mahatma Gandhi and of Gandhism.

For a full length summary see: plot summary.

Film
 Deepa Mehta's 2005 film, Water. Author Bapsi Sidhwa wrote the 2006 novel based upon the film, Water: A Novel, published by Milkweed Press.

References

External links
  Milkweed's own Book Review

2006 novels
Cultural depictions of Mahatma Gandhi
Fiction set in 1938
Novels set in India
Pakistani novels
Novels by Bapsi Sidhwa
Milkweed Editions books